The 2007 Vancouver Whitecaps FC season was the club's 22nd year of existence (or 32nd if counting the NASL Whitecaps), as well as their 15th as a Division 2 club in the franchise model of US-based soccer leagues. After their championship 2006 season despite a number of lingering injuries, the Whitecaps started well and led the league going undefeated until late May. However, with the sudden departure to England of starting goalkeeper Tony Caig and unexpected early season loss of Serge Djekanovic to MLS, the Whitecaps had goalkeeping instability as they gave significant minutes to four goalkeepers in 2007.  Combined with injuries, the club never recovered from the challenging schedule due to 2007 FIFA U-20 venue conflicts, the team finished 7th in the USL-1, set a club record twelve game streak without a win, subsequently executed a blockbuster four player trade of 2006 USL MVP Joey Gjertsen, and midfielder David Testo for role players Ze Roberto and Surrey, BC native Alen Marcina, and set a club record for number of draws with twelve.  A run of games at home to end the season in seventh place (in the playoffs due to a 2007 format change) and the resolution of injuries left the Whitecaps competitive in the second season of the playoffs.  They lost a close playoff series to rival Portland Timbers with a 1-0 home leg getting overturned in a much closer than the score indicated 3–0 second leg loss (in which right back Geordie Lyall suffered a broken leg) to finish their disappointing season.  Coach Bob Lilley was released at the end of the playoffs before the LA Galaxy friendly.

Local rivals Seattle (2005 Champion) and Portland both had strong seasons with Seattle capturing league and playoff titles.  The schedule was not balanced; it was home and away versus each side with additional matches against Seattle, Portland, Minnesota, and expansion side San Francisco based California Victory.  Average attendance increased again and remained above 5,000.  Three double-headers were played with the Whitecaps Women, the USL W-League.  The season's results for both the men's and women's teams may have been disappointing compared to the club's historical competitive norm, but off the field the club was strengthening its foundations.

2007 club growth
A number of factors raised the profile of the Whitecaps beginning in 2007.  First after reaching the semi-final stage a number of times, the Whitecaps USL-1 championship in 2006, the first since the CSL four-peat in the early 1990s, gave the club a higher profile.  Second Canada hosting the 2007 FIFA U-20 World Cup was significant for building media credibility and soccer infrastructure across the country with stadiums built in Toronto (National Soccer Stadium), approved in Montreal (Saputo Stadium opened in 2008), and partially approved in Vancouver (Whitecaps Waterfront Stadium approved by City of Vancouver pending resolution of Port of Metro Vancouver land transfer).  Third the start of play and off-field success of Toronto FC encouraged speculation that Vancouver would pursue a Division 1 MLS franchise.  Fourth one of the two local rivals of the Whitecaps, the Seattle Sounders, over the course of 2007 had more and more credible rumors of being announced as a 2009 MLS expansion side; this was announced November 13, 2007.  Fifth David Beckham signed for the Los Angeles Galaxy giving soccer significant and sustained North American media attention as well as national legitimacy.  Sixth helped by connections to the LA Galaxy coaching staff, there was ongoing speculation in the local newspapers about a LA Galaxy-Whitecaps friendly almost from when the David Beckham signing was announced.  On April 17 Whitecaps announced the friendly against David Beckham and the LA Galaxy for October 3 at 60,000 seat BC Place Stadium.  Despite marketing impacts from an August injury, he played, and it was a 0–0 draw played in front of 48,172 spectators.  Seventh the Whitecaps started a club for local business leaders to advise and advocate for the team called Kickstarters.

The 2007 FIFA U-20 World Cup impacted the Whitecaps' season with a six-game road trip from June 22 to July 7 kicked off a lull in form where the team went 1-7-5 (W-D-L) and didn't recover until a six-game home stand beginning in mid August.  However, as well as media exposure, the U-20 World Cup also spurred $300,000 upgrades to Swangard Stadium including 1,500 individual seats with backs and 36 VIP seats replacing a section of the grandstand's bleachers, better stadium lighting, and better access and egress within the stadium.  The upgrades in seating and access/egress reduced Swangard Stadium's capacity from 5,722 to 5,288.

Schedule and results

Tables

Pre-season

The preseason schedule was announced March 14, 2007 along with a four-week training camp at Simon Fraser University.

USL-1

Results by round

Post-season

Voyageurs Cup

Voyageur Cup standings
Prior to 2008, from when it has been awarded to the Canadian Championship winners, the men's title was decided on regular-season matches between Canada's USL First Division sides.

Cascadia Cup

Staff
Bob Lenarduzzi succeeded John Rocha in the off season as president.  John Rocha stepped down in August 2006 to focus on the 2007 FIFA U-20 World Cup as Vancouver site chairman while continuing to support the Whitecaps in a consulting role.

Soccer operations 
 Manager soccer operations – Greg Anderson
 Team operations – Lindsay Puchlik
 Men's head coach – Bob Lilley
 Men's assistant coach – Todd Wawrousek 
 Reserve team men's head coach – 
 Women's head coach – Bob Birarda
 Reserve team women's head coach
 Communication manager – Nathan Vanstone
 Marketing – Kim Jackman

Business operations 
 Office manager – Lindsay Puchlik
 Director sponsorship services – Steve Lewarne
 Accounting – Wynford Owen

Youth program 
 Director youth operations – Dan Lenarduzzi
 Super Y teams manager – Nanci Robertson
 Coaching staff technical director and boys' director – Tony Fonseca
 Girls' head coach – Steve Simonson
 Head coach development – Jesse Symons
 Director goalkeeping – Michael Toshack
 Manager community soccer programs – Joe Martin

Event management 
 Director event operations – Rachel Lewis
 Operations/game day manager – Hillary Campbell

Current roster
It was a low-scoring year with many players used over the 28 game schedule. Only three players logged 2000 minutes or more; Tony Donatelli led the Whitecaps with 27 appearances.  Eduardo Sebrango led the Whitecaps with seven goals and was in a six way tie for seventh among the USL-1 goal scorers while Martin Nash was tied for third in the USL-1 with six assists in the league.

Player movement
Centre back Ryan Suarez retired due family commitments; in 2006 he was a late season addition to a defense that allowed no goals in playoffs.
 
Victoria, BC native and eight year Whitecaps right back Geordie Lyall signed a contract with League 2 side Walsall F.C. in December 2006.  He wasn't playing with Walsall FC towards the end of their season however and by mid May was being pursued by the Whitecaps.

Defender Lyle Martin from California was announced on March 26.

Due to injury recovery to forwards Joey Gjertsen and Jason Jordan, the Whitecaps signed forward Joel Baily as insurance on March 29.  Baily had been a strike partner of Eduardo Sebrango's previously in Montreal under coach Lilley.

The Whitecaps traded Sita-Taty Matondo back to Montreal Impact for Jason McLaughlin just as preseason was concluding.

With the transition in the back line given the losses of Ryan Suarez and Geordie Lyall plus early season injuries to Steve Klein, the Whitecaps also brought in centre back Narcisse Tchoumi-Tchandja on April 12, 2007.

The signing of two local players defender Nigel Marples of North Delta and Surrey goalkeeper Tyler Baldock was announced April 24.

Goalkeeper Srdjan Djekanović was signed April 27 by Division 1 side Toronto FC after a one-week trial to back up Greg Sutton.  The Whitecaps signed former Toronto Lynx goalkeeper Richard Goddard to the new backup goalkeeper position on April 27.

As of the end of the season.

Goalkeeper stats
{| class="wikitable sortable" style="text-align:center"
|-
| rowspan="2" style="width:15px; text-align:center;"|No.
| rowspan="2" style="width:15px; text-align:center;"|Nat.
| rowspan="2" style="width:120px; text-align:center;"|Player
| colspan="5" style="width:160px; text-align:center;"|Total
| colspan="5" style="width:160px; text-align:center;"|USL-1
| colspan="5" style="width:160px; text-align:center;"|Playoffs
|-
|style="width: 40px;"|
|style="width: 40px;"|
|style="width: 40px;"|
|style="width: 40px;"|
|style="width: 40px;"|
|style="width: 40px;"|
|style="width: 40px;"|
|style="width: 40px;"|
|style="width: 40px;"|
|style="width: 40px;"|
|style="width: 40px;"|
|style="width: 40px;"|
|style="width: 40px;"|
|style="width: 40px;"|
|style="width: 40px;"|
|-
| style="text-align: right;" |1
|
| style="text-align: left;" |Tony Caig
|990
|32
|9
|0.818
|3
|990
|32
|9
|0.818
|3
|
|
|
|
|
|-
| style="text-align: right;" |1
|
| style="text-align: left;" |Matthew Nelson
|450
|14
|4
|0.80
|3
|270
|7
|1
|0.333
|2
|180
|7
|3
|1.50
|1
|-
| style="text-align: right;" |29
|
| style="text-align: left;" |Richard Goddard
|968
|26
|10
|0.929
|4
|968
|26
|10
|0.929
|4
|
|
|
|
|
|-
| style="text-align: right;" |29
|
| style="text-align: left;" |Lutz Pfannenstiel
|292
|5
|4
|0.1.232
|1
|292
|5
|4
|1.232
|1
|
|
|
|
|

Player statistics

References

Vancouver Whitecaps (1986–2010) seasons
Vancouver Whitecaps